Kofi Kaku Amichia (born July 29, 1994) is an American football offensive tackle who is currently a free agent. He played college football at South Florida, and was drafted by the Green Bay Packers in the sixth round of the 2017 NFL Draft.

College career
Amichia attended the University of South Florida, where he played on the South Florida Bulls football team from 2012 to 2016. He was named first-team All-AAC as a senior in 2016.

Professional career

Green Bay Packers
Amichia was selected by the Green Bay Packers with the 212th overall pick in the sixth round of the 2017 NFL Draft. On May 5, 2017, he signed a contract with the Packers. On September 2, 2017, he was released by the Packers during final team cuts. He was signed to the practice squad the following day. Amichia remained on the Packers' practice squad for the entire regular season. On January 3, 2018, he re-signed with the Packers.

On September 1, 2018, Amichia was waived by the Packers.

Baltimore Ravens
On October 24, 2018, Amichia was signed to the Baltimore Ravens practice squad. He signed a reserve/future contract with the Ravens on January 8, 2019. He was waived on May 16, 2019.

Carolina Panthers
On May 29, 2019, Amichia signed with the Carolina Panthers. He was waived/injured during final roster cuts on August 30, 2019, and reverted to the team's injured reserve list the next day. He was waived from injured reserve on September 24.

San Francisco 49ers
On December 11, 2019, Amichia was signed to the San Francisco 49ers practice squad. He re-signed with the 49ers on February 5, 2020. He was waived on August 29, 2020.

Personal life
Amichia is the son of Ghanaian immigrants.

References

External links
Green Bay Packers bio
South Florida Bulls bio

1994 births
Living people
American sportspeople of Ghanaian descent
People from East Point, Georgia
People from Riverdale, Georgia
Sportspeople from Fulton County, Georgia
Sportspeople from the Atlanta metropolitan area
Players of American football from Georgia (U.S. state)
American football offensive guards
American football offensive tackles
South Florida Bulls football players
Green Bay Packers players
Baltimore Ravens players
Carolina Panthers players
San Francisco 49ers players